Vincent Holman (22 September 1886 – 7 April 1962) was a British stage, film and television actor. On stage, he was in the original cast of Arnold Ridley's The Ghost Train at Brighton's Theatre Royal and London's St. Martin's Theatre in 1925-1926.

Selected filmography

 These Charming People (1931) - Andrews (uncredited)
 Stamboul (1931) - Minor Role (uncredited)
 Holiday Lovers (1932) - Salesman (uncredited)
 Follow the Lady (1933) - Parsons
 Taxi to Paradise (1933) - Dunning
 The Shadow (1933) - Wallis
 Death at Broadcasting House (1934) - Detective (uncredited)
 The Feathered Serpent (1934) - Inspector Clarke
 The Right Age to Marry (1935) - (uncredited)
 The Silent Passenger (1935) - Works Manager
 Sexton Blake and the Mademoiselle (1935) - Carruthers
 A Fire Has Been Arranged (1935) - Ex-Detective (uncredited)
 Prison Breaker (1936) - Jackman
 A Touch of the Moon (1936) - (uncredited)
 Gaol Break (1936)
 The Shadow of Mike Emerald (1936) - John Ellman
 To Catch a Thief (1936) - Galloway
 Three Maxims (1936) - Cafe Proprietor
 Special Edition (1938) - Inspector Bourne
 Kate Plus Ten (1938) - Detective
 The Arsenal Stadium Mystery (1939) - Coroner (uncredited)
 Traitor Spy (1939) - Hawker
 The Stars Look Down (1940) - 1st Arresting Policeman (uncredited)
 Crimes at the Dark House (1940) - Asylum Doctor (uncredited)
 The Briggs Family (1940) - Inspector
 'Pimpernel' Smith (1941) - Doctor at Diggings (uncredited)
 Penn of Pennsylvania (1942) - (uncredited)
 The Day Will Dawn (1942) - Sergeant-Major at Evacuation (uncredited)
 Front Line Kids (1942) - (uncredited)
 The Goose Steps Out (1942) - Member of the General Staff (uncredited)
 King Arthur Was a Gentleman (1942) - (uncredited)
 Somewhere on Leave (1943) - Butler
 We Dive at Dawn (1943) - Danish Captain (uncredited)
 The Life and Death of Colonel Blimp (1943) - Club Porter (1942)
 Tawny Pipit (1944) - Ministry Doorman (uncredited)
 Time Flies (1944) - Burleigh (uncredited)
 Love Story (1944) - Prospero
 Medal for the General (1944) - Briggs (uncredited)
 He Snoops to Conquer (1945) - Butler
 Waterloo Road (1945) - Police Inspector at Dance Hall (uncredited)
 I Didn't Do It (1945) - Erasmus Montague
 Perfect Strangers (1945) - ARP Warden
 Johnny Frenchman (1945) - Truscott
 Home Sweet Home (1945) - The Parson
 Pink String and Sealing Wax (1945) - Greengrocer (uncredited) 
 The Echo Murders (1945) - Col. Wills
 The Trojan Brothers (1946) - P.C. Graves
 So Evil My Love (1948) - Rogers
 The Story of Shirley Yorke (1948) - Bates
 Brass Monkey (1948) - Chief Customs Inspector
 Cardboard Cavalier (1949) - Lord Doverhouse
 The Bad Lord Byron (1949) - Bailiff
 The Sound Barrier (1952) - Factor (uncredited)
 My Death Is a Mockery (1952) - Prison Governor
 John Wesley (1954) - Beaumont, a Quaker
 Three's Company (1954) - Mr. Smythe (segment "Take a Number' story)
 The Ladykillers (1955) - Station Master (uncredited)
 Storm Over the Nile (1955) - Burroughs' Butler
 You Pay Your Money (1957) - Briggs

References

External links

1886 births
1962 deaths
English male stage actors
English male film actors
English male television actors
20th-century English male actors